Andrew Dixon (born 19 April 1968) is an English former footballer who made 62 appearances in the Football League playing as a right-back for Grimsby Town and Southend United.

Career
Dixon began his career at Grimsby Town, initially played for the club as a youth before stepping up to the first team. Dixon made 38 Football League appearances during his time at the club, signing for Southend United in 1989. Dixon stayed at Southend for one season, making 24 league appearances, before leaving to join Chelmsford City.

References

1968 births
Living people
Association football defenders
English footballers
People from Louth, Lincolnshire
Grimsby Town F.C. players
Southend United F.C. players
Chelmsford City F.C. players
Basildon United F.C. players
English Football League players